Lonoke School District is a school district in Lonoke County, Arkansas.

References

External links
 

School districts in Arkansas
Education in Lonoke County, Arkansas